Cumuto is a town and district in Trinidad.  Cumuto is east of Sangre Grande and south of Arima. It is within the Sangre Grande region.

Between 1940 and 1956 much of Cumuto was part of the American army base known either as Fort Read or Wallerfield; the area was leased to the United States as part of the Destroyers for Bases Agreement.

Cumuto is the site of the Aripo Savannas Scientific Reserve, an area which contains one of the last remaining areas of natural savanna in Trinidad and Tobago.

Notable residents
Sam Boodram

Populated places in Trinidad and Tobago